is a Japanese anime producer at Production I.G and the president of IG Port subsidiary Wit Studio. He is known for his work on the series Guilty Crown, Attack on Titan, and Psycho Pass.  In 2020 Wada was appointed as Executive Vice President of Production I.G.

References

External links

Japanese anime producers
Japanese animated film producers
Living people
1978 births
Crunchyroll Anime Awards winners